Finska Federationen, was the Finnish branch of the British Ladies National Association for the Repeal of the Contagious Diseases Acts. It was established in 1880 with the purpose to repeal the so-called reglementation system, which required prostitute women to registration and regular medical examination to prevent sexually transmitted infections.

It was suggested by the doctor's wife Constance Ekelund (1850–1889), after she had visited Sweden and Copenhagen and wittnessed the work of the Swedish Federation and the Foreningen imod Lovbeskyttelse for Usædelighed. The members where both men and women and protested against sexual double standards symbolised by the reglementation system. 

The Association managed to have brothels banned in the capital of Helsinki in 1884, and two reforms in the regulation of the Venereal disease legislation in 1894 and 1896; when the control of Venereal disease was removed from the Police and transferred to the health care authorities in 1907, the Federation regarded their goal to have been acheived.

See also
 Foreningen imod Lovbeskyttelse for Usædelighed
 Svenska Federationen

References

Feminism and health
1880s establishments in Finland
1907 disestablishments in Europe
19th century in Helsinki

Feminist organisations in Finland
Women's organisations based in Finland
Venereal disease legislation
Prostitution in Finland
Anti-prostitution activism